The Martin XO-4 (Model 71) was a proposed observation aircraft designed by the Glenn L. Martin Company.  It was designed to compete with the Curtiss XO-1, Douglas XO-2, and Dayton-Wright XO-3, and was to be powered by a Wright T-3 Tornado or a Liberty V-1650.  Although it failed to receive a contract from the United States Navy, a single prototype (allocated the serial number 23-1255) was ordered by the United States Army Air Service, but this contract was canceled before the prototype could be built.

References 

O-4
1920s United States military reconnaissance aircraft